HIBRIA is a Brazilian power metal/speed metal band, known for their technicality and speed. The band cites influences from traditional metal bands such as Iron Maiden and Judas Priest, thrash bands such as Metallica and Megadeth, and progressive bands such as Dream Theater.

HIBRIA toured across Europe in 1999, in the "Against the Faceless" demo tour, playing 29 concerts through Belgium, Germany, Netherlands, Czech Republic and Poland. The band was on the roster to perform at ProgPower USA XVI in September 2015, which would have been their first time performing in the United States. However the band was not allowed into the country, and they did not get to perform at ProgPower USA. In December 2017, it was announced that Iuri Sanson, Eduardo Baldo, Renato Osorio, and Ivan Beck would be leaving the band. One more release titled Moving Ground, featuring this lineup, was released in February 2018 in Japan.

Discography

Albums

Demos
 1997 – Metal Heart (demo)
 1999 – Against The Faceless (demo)

Videography

Band members 
 Abel Camargo (Guitars) (1996-present)
 Victor Emeka (Vocals) (2018-present)
 Otávio Quiroga (Drums) (2019-present)
 Thiago Baumgartem (Bass) (2020-present)
 Vicente Telles (Guitars) (2022-present)

Former members 
 Bruno Godinho (Guitars) (2019-2022)
 Alexandre Panta (Bass) (2019-2020)
 Guga Munhoz (Guitars) (2018-2018)
 Martin Estevez (Drums) (2018-2018)
 Iuri Sanson (Vocals) (1997-2017)
 Renato Osorio (Guitars) (2012-2017)
 Ivan Beck (Bass) (2016-2017)
 Eduardo Baldo (Drums) (2005-2017)
 Benhur Lima (Bass) (2010-2016)
 Diego Kasper (Guitars) (1997-2011)
 Marco Panichi (Bass) (1996-2010)
 Savio Sordi (Drums) (1996-2005)

References

External links 
 Official homepage
 [ Hibria] at AllMusic

Brazilian heavy metal musical groups
Musical groups established in 1996
Musical groups from Porto Alegre
1996 establishments in Brazil
Brazilian power metal musical groups